Bearskin Lake First Nation is an Oji-Cree First Nation reserve in Kenora District, Ontario, Canada, located  north of Sioux Lookout.  Bearskin First Nation's total registered population  was 900, of which their on-reserve population was 461.

Three settlements make up the Bearskin Lake First Nation. Originally located on Bearskin Lake  to the southwest, their main community moved to its present site on Michikan Lake ("Fish Trap Lake") in the 1930s and is accessible only by air from Bearskin Lake Airport or winter road.  The main village is situated on the west shore of the lake and all three settlements are linked to one another by all weather gravel roads.  The First Nation still retains the  Bearskin Lake Indian Reserve in which all three lie. The reserve also contains a segment of the Severn River, into which Michikan Lake flows, and of Severn Lake.

Prior to achieving full Band and reserve status in 1975, Bearskin was a satellite community of the Kitchenuhmaykoosib Inninuwug First Nation (Big Trout Lake First Nation),  to the east. Today, Bearskin Lake First Nation is a member of the Windigo First Nations Council, a regional tribal council that is a member of the Nishnawbe Aski Nation.

Bearskin Lake is policed by the Nishnawbe-Aski Police Service, an Aboriginal-based service.

Governance

Bearskin First Nation is governed by Chief Rosemary McKay and her Deputy Chief Leonard "Wayne" Brown; their 3-year term began on April 1, 2014.  In addition, the First Nation's Council is four councillors: Stuart Kamenawatamin, Gary Kamenawatamin, George Kamenawatamin, and Roderick Kamenawatamin.

External links
Chiefs of Ontario profile
AANDC profile

References

Communities in Kenora District
Nishnawbe Aski Nation
Oji-Cree reserves in Ontario